El Refugio ("The Refuge") is a town in the Tizapan El Alto municipality of Jalisco, Mexico.

References

Populated places in Jalisco